This was the first edition of the tournament and the first Challenger tournament in Turin since 2011.

Ruben Bemelmans and Daniel Masur won the title after defeating Sander Arends and David Pel 3–6, 6–3, [10–8] in the final.

Seeds

Draw

References

External links
 Main draw

Torino Challenger - Doubles